Jedlicze  is a town in Krosno County, Subcarpathian Voivodeship, Poland, with a population of 5,645 (02.06.2009).  It is home to a petroleum refinery.

The settlement of Jedlicze was founded in the late 14th century, and was first mentioned in 1409. Its name comes from a Slavic word jedla, which means fir tree. In 1410, local soltys, Piotr of Jedlicze, fought in the Battle of Grunwald. Until the mid-16th century, Jedlicze belonged to the noble families of Mleczko and Baczalski. In 1657, the village was ransacked by Transilvanian soldiers (see Swedish invasion of Poland)
 
In the late 17th century, Jedlicze belonged to the Wielowiejski family, which unsuccessfully tried to grant town charter to the village. Finally, Jedlicze became a town in 1768, during the reign of King Stanisław August Poniatowski. On April 5, 1770, a Polish–Russian battle took place near Jedlicze, during the Bar Confederation.

Following the first partition of Poland (1772), Jedlicze was annexed by the Habsburg Empire, and remained in Austrian Galicia until 1918. In 1884, the village, as Austrian authorities stripped it of the town charter, received rail connection with Stróże and Zagórz, and in 1899–1902, a large oil refinery was built here. The village remained in private hands until the 1920s, its last owner was Walerian Stawiarski.

During World War II, local Jewish population was decimated in The Holocaust. On February 25, 1942, the Gestapo arrested a number of Polish underground movement activists, who gathered at the Stawiarski Palace. In 1944, 22 men were shot as a reprisal for killing a police officer. Jedlicze had a Home Army post; its local unit in April 1943 attacked a Ukrainian pro-Nazi training school.

Jedlicze regained its town charter in 1967. Among interesting places, it has a neo-Gothic church (1925), the Stawiarski Palace with a park, neo-Gothic cemetery chapel (1864). Two daughters of Maria Konopnicka are buried here – Laura Pytlinska (died 1935) and Zofia Mickiewiczowa (died 1956). In nearby village of Zarnowiec there is an 18th-century manor house, which belonged to Maria Konopnicka. Currently, it houses the Biographical Museum of Maria Konopnicka.

References
Notes

Cities and towns in Podkarpackie Voivodeship
Krosno County
Kingdom of Galicia and Lodomeria
Lwów Voivodeship
Holocaust locations in Poland
Nazi war crimes in Poland

it:Jedlicze